Alexandrovka is a rural locality (a selo) in Volokonovsky District, Belgorod Oblast, Russia. The population was 117 in 2010. There are two streets.

Geography 
Alexandrovka is located 18 km southeast of Volokonovka (the district's administrative centre) by road. Golofeyevka is the nearest rural locality.

References 

Rural localities in Volokonovsky District